This is a list of Austro-Hungarian Navy ships.

Capital ships

Ships of the line 

 SMS Santa Elisabetta - ex-British ship bought in Naples 1720
 SMS San Michele - ex-British ship bought in Naples 1720

SMS San Carlos 84 (1695) - ex-British ship Cumberland bought in Naples 1720
SMS Emo 80 (1815) - ex-French ship Saturno captured in Venice 1814 broken up on stocks
SMS Cesare 74 (1815) - ex-French ship Montebello captured in Venice 1814
 92 (1858) - Later ironclad (see below)

Ironclad ships 

 
  (1861)
  (1861)
 
  (1862)
  (1862)
  (1862)
 
  (1865)
  (1865)
  (1869)
  (1858) – former ship of the line, re-launched 1871 as ironclad
  (1872)
  (1872)
 
  (1875)
  (1875)
  (1877) 
  (1878) 
  (1887)
  (1887)

Coastal defence ships
 
  (1895)
  (1895)
  (1895) – sunk at anchor by an Italian torpedo motor-boat inside the defences of Trieste harbour in 1917

Battleships 

 
  (1900)
  (1901)
  (1902)
 
  (1903)
  (1904)
  (1905)
 
  (1908)
  (1909)
  (1910)
  (all c21,700 metric tons displacement)
  (1911)
  (1912)
  (1912)
  (1914)
  (Projected)

Cruisers

Armoured cruisers 
  (1893)(rebuild 1909)
  (1900)
  (1903)

Small cruisers 
Torpedo cruisers
 
  (1879)
  (1879)
  (1882)
  (1883)
 Panther class
  (1885)
  (1885)
  (1887)
Protected cruisers
 
  (1890)
   (1892)
 
  (1899)
  (1899)
  (1899)
Fast cruisers (Rapidkreuzer)
  (1910)
 
  (1914)
  (1912)
  (1913)
 3 ships planned (1917 projected)

Sailing ships
Sailing frigates
  (1808) Ex-French Carolina
 
 Bellona (1811) - ex-French Régénérateur
 Reale Italiano (1812) - ex-French Royal Italien
 
  (1811) - ex-French Princesse de Bologne
  (1812) - ex-French Piave
  - ex-French Amphitrite
  (1820) - ex-French Hébé
  (1827) - ex-French Moskva
  (1829) - ex-French Guerrière
  (1832) - ex-French Vénus
  (1842)
  (1850) – Later screw frigate (see below)
  (1853) – Later screw frigate (see below)
Sailing corvettes
  (1834)
  (1838)
  (1844)
Sailing brigs
  (1831)
  (1832)
  (1843)
  (1847)
Schooners (goelettes)
  (1833)
  (1834)
  (1837) 
  (1837)
  (1850) 
  (1851)
  (1855)
Paddle steamers (Radaviso)
  (1843)
  (1847)
  (1848)
  (1848)
  (1848)
  (1848)
  (1850)
  (1850)
  
  (1851)
  (1854)
  
  (1857)
Screw frigates
 
 
 
  (1850) – Ex-sailing frigate, 1862
  (1853) – Ex-sailing frigate, 1862
  (1872) – Renamed  1908
  (1873) – Renamed  1900
Screw corvettes
 
 
 
  – Renamed  1912
 
Screw sloops
  (1867)
  (1870) – Hulked and renamed  1902
  (1870)
  (1873)
  (1873)

Destroyers and torpedo boats 
Second Class Torpedo boats
  – 1 ships (1875)
  – 1 ships (1878)
  – 2 ships (1879)
  – 4 ships (1881)
  – 2 ships (1881)
  – 16 ships (1883)
  – 6 ships (1886)
  – 1 ship (1887)
  – 6 ships (1889)
Coastal Torpedo boats
  – 2 ships (1886)
 
 
  – 22 ships (1885–1891)
 
 
 
 
 
 
 
 
 
 
 
 
 
 
 
 
 
 
 
 
 
 
 (1896)
 (1896)
  – 4 ships (1898–1899)
 
 
  (1898)
 
  – 12 ships (1909–1911)
 Trieste-group - 6 ships (1909–1910)
TB.I
TB.II
TB.III
TB.IV
TB.V
TB.VI
 Fiume-group - 6 ships (1910–1911)
TB.VII
TB.VIII
TB.IX
TB.X
TB.XI
TB.XII
High seas torpedo boats
  – 24 ships (1905–1909)
 
 
 
 
 
 
 
 
 
 
 
 
 
 
 
 
 
 
 
 
 
 
 
 
  – 27 ships (1913–1916)
 T-group - 8 ships (1913–1914)
74 T
75 T
76 T
77 T
78 T
79 T
80 T
81 T
 F-group - 16 ships (1914–1916)
82 F
83 F
84 T
85 T
86 T
87 F
88 T
89 T
90 T
91 T
92 F
93 F
94 F
95 F
96 F
97 F
 M-group - 3 ships (1914–1915)
98 M
99 M
100 M
Torpedo gunboats
  (1887)
  (1888)
  (1888)
  (1889)
  (1890)
  (1892)
  (1896) (named a torpedo cruiser in the shipyard)
Destroyers
  – 13 ships (1905–1910)
 
 
  (1905)
  (1909)
 
 
  (Sniper)
 
 
 
 
 
 
  (1912)
  – 10 ships (1912–1917)
 
 
  (1913)
 
 
  (1913)
 Ersatz Triglav class
 
  (1917)
  (1917)

Submarines 

U-1-class Lake Type Submarines – 2 ships
 
 

U-3 class – 2 ships
 
 

U-5 class Holland Type Submarines – 3 ships
 
 
  Temporarily Designated U-7

U-7 class Sold to Germany – 5 ships
 SMS U-7 Sold as  1914
 SMS U-8 Sold as  1914
 SMS U-9 Sold as  1914
 SMS U-10 Sold as  1914
 SMS U-11 Sold as  1914

U-10 class German UB I class Submarine – 9 ships
 SMS U-7 (temporary Austrian number for German  when operating in the Mediterranean)
 SMS U-8 (temporary Austrian number for German  when operating in the Mediterranean)
 SMS U-9 (temporary Austrian number for German  when operating in the Mediterranean)
  Ex-German UB-1
  Ex-German UB-15
 
 
 
  (temporary Austrian number for German  when operating in the Mediterranean)

 – 1 ship
  Ex-French Curie

German Type UC I submarine Mine-layer Submarines – 4 ships
  (temporary Austrian number for German  when operating in the Mediterranean)
  (temporary Austrian number for German  when operating in the Mediterranean)
  (temporary Austrian number for German  when operating in the Mediterranean)
  (temporary Austrian number for German  when operating in the Mediterranean)

 – 4 ships
 
 
 
 

 Modified German UB II Class built in Austria-Hungary – 8 ships
 
 
 
 
 
 
 
 

German Type U 31 submarine – 6 ships
  (temporary Austrian number for German  when operating in the Mediterranean)
  (temporary Austrian number for German  when operating in the Mediterranean)
  (temporary Austrian number for German  when operating in the Mediterranean)
  (temporary Austrian number for German  when operating in the Mediterranean)
  (temporary Austrian number for German  when operating in the Mediterranean)
  (temporary Austrian number for German  when operating in the Mediterranean)

German Type U 19 submarine – 1 ship
  (temporary Austrian number for German  when operating in the Mediterranean)

German Type U 43 submarine – 1 ship
  (temporary Austrian number for German  when operating in the Mediterranean)

 German UB II class Submarine – 6 ships
  (temporary Austrian number for German  when operating in the Mediterranean)
  Ex-German UB-43 Purchased from Germany
  (temporary Austrian number for German  when operating in the Mediterranean)
  (temporary Austrian number for German  when operating in the Mediterranean)
  (temporary Austrian number for German  when operating in the Mediterranean)
  Ex-German UB-47 Purchased from Germany

 Started 1916 never completed – 4 ships
 
 
  Ordered 1918 never Started
  Ordered 1918 never Started

 Started 1916 never completed – 4 ships
 
 
  Ordered 1918 never Started
  Ordered 1918 never Started

 Started 1916 never completed – 4 ships
 
 
  Ordered 1917 never Started
  Ordered 1917 never Started

German Type UC II submarine Mine-layer Submarines – 19 ships
  (temporary Austrian number for German  when operating in the Mediterranean)
  (temporary Austrian number for German  when operating in the Mediterranean)
  (temporary Austrian number for German  when operating in the Mediterranean)
  (temporary Austrian number for German  when operating in the Mediterranean)
  (temporary Austrian number for German  when operating in the Mediterranean)
  (temporary Austrian number for German  when operating in the Mediterranean)
  (temporary Austrian number for German  when operating in the Mediterranean)
  (temporary Austrian number for German  when operating in the Mediterranean)
  (temporary Austrian number for German  when operating in the Mediterranean)
  (temporary Austrian number for German  when operating in the Mediterranean)
  (temporary Austrian number for German  when operating in the Mediterranean)
  (temporary Austrian number for German  when operating in the Mediterranean)
  (temporary Austrian number for German  when operating in the Mediterranean)
  (temporary Austrian number for German  when operating in the Mediterranean)
  (temporary Austrian number for German  when operating in the Mediterranean)
  (temporary Austrian number for German  when operating in the Mediterranean)
  (temporary Austrian number for German  when operating in the Mediterranean)
  (temporary Austrian number for German  when operating in the Mediterranean)
  (temporary Austrian number for German  when operating in the Mediterranean)

German Type U 63 submarine – 3 ships
  (temporary Austrian number for German  when operating in the Mediterranean)
  (temporary Austrian number for German  when operating in the Mediterranean)
  (temporary Austrian number for German  when operating in the Mediterranean)

German Type UB III submarine – 20 ships
  (temporary Austrian number for German  when operating in the Mediterranean)
  (temporary Austrian number for German  when operating in the Mediterranean)
  (temporary Austrian number for German  when operating in the Mediterranean)
  (temporary Austrian number for German  when operating in the Mediterranean)
  (temporary Austrian number for German  when operating in the Mediterranean)
  (temporary Austrian number for German  when operating in the Mediterranean)
  (temporary Austrian number for German  when operating in the Mediterranean)
  (temporary Austrian number for German  when operating in the Mediterranean)
  (temporary Austrian number for German  when operating in the Mediterranean)
  (temporary Austrian number for German  when operating in the Mediterranean)
  (temporary Austrian number for German  when operating in the Mediterranean)
  (temporary Austrian number for German  when operating in the Mediterranean)
  (temporary Austrian number for German  when operating in the Mediterranean)
  (temporary Austrian number for German  when operating in the Mediterranean)
  (temporary Austrian number for German  when operating in the Mediterranean)
  (temporary Austrian number for German  planned but not completed)
  (temporary Austrian number for German  planned but not completed)
  (temporary Austrian number for German  planned but not completed)
  (temporary Austrian number for German  planned but not completed)
  (temporary Austrian number for German  planned but not completed)

German Type UE I submarine Mine-layer Submarines – 2 ships
  (temporary Austrian number for German  when operating in the Mediterranean)
  (temporary Austrian number for German  when operating in the Mediterranean)

 Meant to replace U1-U6 and then adopt those numbers – 9 ships
  Ex-U-88 Laid down 1917 never completed
  Ex-U-89 Laid down 1918 never completed
  Ex-U-90 Laid down 1918 never completed
  Ex-U-91 never started
  Ex-U-92 never started
  Ex-U-93 never started
  never started
  never started
  never started

 Laid down 1918 never completed, numbers planned up to U-141 – 4 ships
  Ex-U-94
  Ex-U-95
  Ex-U-96
  Ex-U-97

German Type UC III submarine – 2 ships
  (temporary Austrian number for German  when operating in the Mediterranean)
  (temporary Austrian number for German  when operating in the Mediterranean)

River monitors 

 
  (1871)
  (1871)
 
 
  (1892)
 
 
  (1904)
 
 
 
 
 
 SMS Temes (II) (1915)

Gunboats 
Paddle gunboats
  (1859) – River Danube
  – Lagoon
  (1860)
  (1860)
  (1860)
  (1860)
Screw gunboats
 
  (1859) – River Danube
 
  (1860)
  (1860)
  – Lagoon
  (1860)
  (1860)
  (1860)
  – Lake Garda
  (1860)
  (1860)
  (1860)
  (1860)
  (1860)
  (1860)
 
  (1861)
  (1861)
  (1861)
 
  (1861)
  (1861)
  (1861)
  (1861)
 
 
  (1861)
  (1861)
 
  (1873)
  (1873)
River gunboats
  (1915)
  (1915)
  (1918)

Minelayers
 
 
 SMS Basilisk

Armed Merchants
Cruising Steamers

Submarine hunters

Patrol ships

Gunboats
 Ex-Trieste
 Ex-San Marco Di Rosandra
 Ex-Epulo
 Ex-San Guisto

Auxiliary ships
Colliers and Oilers
 

 ex-Etelka
 unnamed oiler
 ex-Corsinia
 ex-Izvor
 ex-Amphitrite
 ex-Fiume
 ex-Austria

 Changed to depot ship
Water Carriers
SMS Najade
SMS Nymphe

Salvage ships

Tugs
 Rescue tug
 Rescue tug

Sea rescue vessel

Submarine depot ships
 
 
 
Destroyer depot ships
  ex-Gastein (also served as armed troopship)
Mine depot ships
  Ex-Carniolia
  Ex-Urano
Ammunition ships
  Ex-Goritia
  Ex-Bucovina
  Ex-Styria
 
  Ex-Baron Call
Cargo ships
  Ex-Kephallonia
  Ex-Hrvat
  Ex-Zichy
 Ex-Fram
 
 
 
 
Troop ships
 
 
 
Hospital ships
  Ex-Afria
Repair Ships
  
 SMS Vulcan Ex-Prinz Eugen 1877
Accommodation Ships
  
 
  
 
  
  (doubled as Hospital Ship)

See also 
 Austro-Hungarian Navy

References 

Austria-Hungary
 
Austro-Hungarian military-related lists